Smoking laws may refer to:
Smoking ban, bans on smoking in public places
Smoking age, legal age to purchase and/or consume tobacco products